Sathankulam taluk is a taluk of Thoothukudi district of the Indian state of Tamil Nadu. The headquarters of the taluk is the town of Sathankulam.

Demographics
According to the 2011 census, the taluk of Sathankulam had a population of 98,583 with 47,444  males and 51,139 females. There were 1078 women for every 1000 men. The taluk had a literacy rate of 81.18. Child population in the age group below 6 was 4,941 Males and 4,746 Females.

References 

Taluks of Thoothukudi district